Asad ibn Yazid al-Shaybani was an Arab general and governor for the Abbasid Caliphate, active in the early 9th century.

Asad was a member of the Shayban tribe, dominant in the region of Diyar Bakr in the northern Jazira, and son of Yazid ibn Mazyad al-Shaybani, who served twice as Arab governor (ostikan) of Arminiya (a large province encompassing the whole of Transcaucasia). By 801, when his father died, Asad was governor of Mosul, and succeeded him as ostikan for about a year; he was in turn succeeded by his brother Muhammad. Asad was re-appointed as ostikan under Caliph al-Amin (r. 809–813) to confront an uprising of the Arab settlers in Iberia under Yahya ibn Sa'id and Ismail ibn Shu'ayb. Asad was successful in quelling the revolt and capturing its leaders, but he later pardoned and released them, and because of this was dismissed from his office.

References

Sources
 

8th-century births
9th-century deaths
Abbasid governors of Arminiya
Banu Shayban
8th-century Arabs
9th-century Arabs